Franklin Castle (also known as the Tiedemann House) is a Victorian stone house, built in the American Queen Anne style, located at 4308 Franklin Boulevard in Cleveland's Ohio City neighborhood. The building has four stories and more than twenty rooms and eighty windows. In the late nineteenth century, when it was built, Franklin Boulevard was one of the most prestigious residential avenues in Cleveland. It is reported to be the most haunted house in Ohio.

On March 15, 1982, it was added to the National Register of Historic Places.

Early history
The house was built in 1881-1883 by the famed architectural firm of Cudell & Richardson for Hannes Tiedemann, a prosperous German immigrant.

On January 15, 1881, Tiedemann's fifteen-year-old daughter Emma succumbed to diabetes. The property saw its second death not long afterwards when Tiedemann's elderly mother, Wiebeka, died. During the next three years the Tiedemanns would bury three more children, giving rise to speculation that there was more to the deaths than met the eye.

To distract his wife, Louise, from these tragedies, Tiedemann began extensive construction on the home, adding a ballroom which runs the length of the house on the fourth floor of the manor. Also during this building, turrets and gargoyles were added to the edifice's facade, giving the house an even more pronounced "castle" appearance.

It is rumored that hidden rooms and passageways were used for bootlegging during Prohibition. Though rumored, none of these rooms or passageways exist other than a small stairway used by servants from the kitchen to the front door.

Louise Tiedemann died from a liver disease on March 24, 1895, at the age of fifty-seven. The next year, Hannes sold the house to the Mullhauser family, and by 1908 he and the entire Tiedemann family were dead, leaving no one to inherit his considerable personal wealth.

Rumors of crimes committed in the house by Tiedemann (including sexual indiscretions and murder) have contributed to Franklin Castle's reputation as a haunted house.

Middle years
From 1921 to 1968 the house functioned as a home to various German and cultural organizations. In January 1968, James Romano, his wife, and six children settled in the home. The Romano family reported several encounters with ghosts in their new home, and attempted exorcisms and even had a now-defunct ghost-hunting group (the Northeast Ohio Psychical Research Society) investigate the castle. By 1974, the Romanos decided to leave the house, and sold it to Sam Muscatello, who planned to turn the castle into a church. To raise money for the church, haunted house tours and overnight stays at the castle were offered.
Human bones were found in a closet in 1975 but it's believed they were planted by the new owner looking to gain publicity for his ghost tours of the property.

In 1982, the location was added to the National Register of Historic Places.

In early 1984, Michael DeVinko, Judy Garland's fifth and last husband, purchased Franklin Castle and almost immediately started making major renovations to the house. Over the next ten years, DeVinko spent close to one million dollars renovating the Castle, even going so far as to track down some of the original furnishings for the Castle. Despite all this, DeVinko put the house up for sale in 1994.

Recent history

There have been a series of owners in the past thirty years. The castle was empty from 1994 until in 1999, Michelle Heimburger bought the castle and carriage house for $350,000 using part of her Yahoo! stock windfall as one of the company's early employees. A native Clevelander, Heimburger was fascinated with the home and purchased it with intentions of restoring the building to its former glory. Unfortunately, that same year, a fire badly damaged the castle. Though extensive repairs were done, the house restoration could not be completed.

In 2004 there were rumors that Franklin Castle was going to be completely renovated and turned into the Franklin Castle Club. As of 2006, the entire club was proven to be a complete sham, no repairs had ever been made, and the pictures on the website were all either close-up shots of individual architecture, or pictures stolen from other websites. No work had ever been done, no memberships had ever been sold, and there was also evidence that the Castle had been used to shoot pornography. Around this time, though, the exterior stone of the building was cleaned and the parapet, on the left side of the facade, was rebuilt according to the 18th-century design.

The property was damaged again in March 2011 when the carriage house was damaged in a fire.

It was announced in July 2011 that the Franklin Castle had been rezoned to allow it to become a three-family dwelling, and that a sale was pending.

European tapestry artist Chiara Dona Dalle purchased Franklin Castle in 2011 for $260,000. The Cleveland Building & Housing Department issued a permit for residential exterior alterations in February 2012. Local news sources have reported that the buyer intends to convert the building into three family homes and dwelling in two of the spaces.

Following several years of historic renovations, the owners announced single-night accommodations were available for guests on December 24, 2022.

In popular culture
On March 18, 2016, the reality TV series Paranormal Lockdown featured the Franklin Castle in the third episode of its first season.

On March 5, 2020, Franklin Castle was featured on the fifth episode of Season 19 of Ghost Adventures which aired on the Travel Channel.

On November 19, 2020, Franklin Castle was featured on episode four Season 2 of The Holzer Files which aired on the Travel Channel.

References

External links
Franklin Castle: The Most Haunted House In Ohio?
Franklin Castle
Haunted Cleveland 
Encyclopedia of Cleveland History
 National Register of Historic Places, Franklin Castle 

Houses on the National Register of Historic Places in Ohio
Queen Anne architecture in Ohio
Houses completed in 1881
Houses in Cleveland
Reportedly haunted locations in Ohio
German-American culture in Cleveland
National Register of Historic Places in Cleveland, Ohio
Ohio City, Cleveland
1881 establishments in Ohio